Jarchelu (also Romanized as Jārchelū; also known as Jārchīlū) is a village in Zarrineh Rud Rural District, in the Central District of Miandoab County, West Azerbaijan Province, Iran. At the 2006 census, its population was 835, in 210 families.

References 

Populated places in Miandoab County